Albert Dolleschall (26 July 1887 – 14 September 1939) was an Austrian equestrian. He competed in two events at the 1936 Summer Olympics.

References

External links
 

1887 births
1939 deaths
Austrian male equestrians
Olympic equestrians of Austria
Equestrians at the 1936 Summer Olympics
Sportspeople from Vienna
Austrian military personnel killed in World War II